This is a list of military leaders of the Italian Wars.

Notes

References

 Arfaioli, Maurizio. The Black Bands of Giovanni: Infantry and Diplomacy During the Italian Wars (1526–1528).  Pisa: Pisa University Press, Edizioni Plus, 2005. .
 Arnold, Thomas F. The Renaissance at War. Smithsonian History of Warfare, edited by John Keegan. New York: Smithsonian Books / Collins, 2006. .
 Baumgartner, Frederic J. Louis XII. New York: St. Martin's Press, 1994. .
 Black, Jeremy. "Dynasty Forged by Fire." MHQ: The Quarterly Journal of Military History 18, no. 3 (Spring 2006): 34–43. .
 ———. European Warfare, 1494–1660. Warfare and History, edited by Jeremy Black. London: Routledge, 2002. .
 Blockmans, Wim. Emperor Charles V, 1500–1558. Translated by Isola van den Hoven-Vardon. New York: Oxford University Press, 2002. .
 Guicciardini, Francesco. The History of Italy. Translated by Sydney Alexander. Princeton: Princeton University Press, 1984. .
 Hackett, Francis. Francis the First. Garden City, New York: Doubleday, Doran & Co., 1937.
 Hall, Bert S.  Weapons and Warfare in Renaissance Europe: Gunpowder, Technology, and Tactics.  Baltimore: Johns Hopkins University Press, 1997. .
 Knecht, Robert J. Renaissance Warrior and Patron: The Reign of Francis I. Cambridge: Cambridge University Press, 1994. .
 Konstam, Angus. Pavia 1525: The Climax of the Italian Wars. Oxford: Osprey Publishing, 1996. .
 Norwich, John Julius. A History of Venice. New York: Vintage Books, 1989. .
 Oman, Charles. A History of the Art of War in the Sixteenth Century.  London: Methuen & Co., 1937.
 Phillips, Charles and Alan Axelrod. Encyclopedia of Wars. 3 vols. New York: Facts on File, 2005. .
 Taylor, Frederick Lewis. The Art of War in Italy, 1494–1529. Westport, Conn.: Greenwood Press, 1973. .

 
Italian Wars
Lists of Italian military personnel